Gerardo Caccianemici may refer to:
Pope Lucius II (1144–1145)
Gerardo Caccianemici (cardinal), cardinal-deacon (1145–1155)